Events from the year 1390 in Ireland.

Incumbent
Lord: Richard II

Events
The town of Ballinrobe in Mayo is founded.
1390 or 1391 – the Book of Ballymote is written.

Births

Deaths